Irish Fiscal Advisory Council (Fiscal Council) is a non-departmental statutory body providing independent assessments and analysis of the Irish Government's fiscal stance, its economic and budgetary forecasts, and its compliance with fiscal rules. The Fiscal Council was created as part of a wider agenda of budgetary reform after the financial crisis.

The establishment of a fiscal council had been proposed domestically in the National Recovery Plan 2011-2014 and by the Joint Committee on Finance and the Public Service in November 2010. It also became a requirement of the EU/IMF Programme of Financial
Support for Ireland (December 2010). Its establishment follows moves to establish independent watchdogs internationally as a means of avoiding repeats of fiscal crises and to promote more transparency around the public finances.

Purpose
The Fiscal Council was formed as part of a programme of reform of Ireland's "budgetary architecture" post the Irish economic crisis.  It was established on an interim basis in July 2011, and legally constituted under the Fiscal Responsibility Act 2012 which was part of the EU-IMF Programme of Financial Support for Ireland (and whose terms required the creation of a "budgetary advisory council to provide an independent assessment of Government forecasts").

The formation of the Fiscal Council was a response to the perceived failure of established Irish economic and Irish regulatory institutions to anticipate and warn over the consequences of the Irish credit bubble (i.e. the so-called "green jersey agenda"), and/or to engage in the concerns that were being raised by various international monitors at the time (IMF and OECD) regarding Ireland's economic situation.

The Fiscal Council performs a similar role to the "Office for Budget Responsibility" in the United Kingdom (also formed after the financial crisis), and other equivalent members of the "Network of European Union Independent Fiscal Institutions" (which the Fiscal Council joined in September 2015).

The Fiscal Council is structured as a Council of five members (one Chairperson) and a supporting analytical team of about seven

The formal mandate of the Irish Fiscal Advisory Council (per the Fiscal Council website) is to:
 Assess and endorse the Irish Government's official macroeconomic forecasts.
 Assess the Irish Government's budgetary forecasts.
 Assess the broader fiscal stance of the Irish Government.
 Monitor compliance with legislated fiscal rules by the Irish Government.

The Fiscal Council has been well received by Irish financial commentators and its publications are widely covered in the Irish media.

Publications

The key mandated publications of the Irish Fiscal Advisory Council are:
 Bi-annual Fiscal Assessment Report (FAR) (produced after the Irish autumn Budget, and the spring Stability Update).
 Bi-annual Endorsement Letters of macroeconomic forecasts (produced in advance of the Irish autumn Budget, and the spring Stability Update).
 Annual Pre-Budget Statement (produced before the Irish autumn Budget).
 Annual Ex-Post Assessment of Compliance with the Domestic Budgetary Rule.

The Irish Fiscal Advisory Council commenced an annual conference titled “Path for the Public Finances” in March 2017. The goal is to bring attention to long-term Irish State finance issues relevant for Ireland. International speakers attend. Each annual event is intended to focus on a particular theme, which has been:
 March 2017 Path for the Public Finances: Fiscal Risks.
 March 2018 Path for the Public Finances: Too Hot, Too Cold! The Irish Cycle.
March 2019 Path for the Public Finances: Long-Term Fiscal Sustainability

The Fiscal Council also publishes Analytical Notes and Working Papers in areas of concern to Irish financial stability (including House Prices, Tax Receipts, Public Debt, and EU Rules/Guidelines).

Focus

The Fiscal Council focuses on macro-fiscal issues; that is, issues that relate to the whole economy as well as to the public finances in Ireland. The Council's output typically covers the recent and future macroeconomic outlook, both from a short-term (demand-side) and medium- to long-term (supply-side) perspective. It puts more weight on the longer-term prospects of the domestic economy in terms of its assessments of how appropriate the Government's budgetary stance is. It also focuses on the cyclical position of the economy to assess whether recent developments might be of a sustainable nature or whether the economy might be expected to outperform or under perform in future. It also puts a lot of emphasis on analysing various imbalances and risks to the economy and public finances.

The Council has brought attention to issues including: 
 the risks associated with the Government's reliance on corporation tax receipts to fund public services as well as the concentration, volatility, and unpredictable nature of corporation tax receipts.
 improving analysis of the more tax-rich Domestic economy (ignoring distortions present in GDP) and its cyclical performance
 measuring uncertainty around macroeconomic and budgetary forecasts
 ways to improve Ireland's budgetary framework (including through assessments of how the Rainy Day Fund could be redeveloped, how medium-term spending by Government could be better anchored, and how the Government's debt targets could be better devised).

Council

Chairperson
 1st (2011-2016) UCG Professor John McHale.
 2nd (2016-2019) UCC economist Seamus Coffey.
 3rd (2020-current)  Sebastian Barnes (acting)

Council members
 Mr. Sebastian Barnes
 Mr. Michael G. Tutty
 Dr. Martina Lawless
Prof. Michael McMahon
(past) Dr. Ide Kearney
 (past) Professor Alan Barrett
 (past) Professor Donal Donovan
 (past) Dr. Róisín O’Sullivan
 (past) Professor John McHale

See also
 Irish Economic and Social Research Institute
 Central Bank of Ireland
 EU Independent Fiscal Institutions Network
 Central Statistics Office (Ireland)

References

External links

Professor John McHale Bio
Seamus Coffey Bio
Irish Department of Finance Fiscal Council Portal
OECD Government Budgeting Portal
IMF Ireland Portal
EU Financial Assistance Portal
EUROSAI Audit of Irish Fiscal Advisory Council

Government agencies of the Republic of Ireland
Economy of the Republic of Ireland
Economic research institutes